MJAFT! is a non governmental organisation in Albania that is partly funded by the U.S. government.

See also
 Erion Veliaj
 Elisa Spiropali
 Politics of Albania
 Color Revolution

References

External links 
 Official site (in Albanian and English)
 NPR Story on Mjaft!

Political youth organizations
Youth organizations based in Albania